WATZ-FM (99.3 FM, "99.3 WATZ") is a radio station broadcasting a country music format.  The station is licensed to the city of Alpena. WATZ has been assigned the same call sign since it signed on in the late 1960s. The station, along with sister station WZTK, is currently owned by Midwestern Broadcasting Company. From 2006 to 2020, the station simulcasted on Rogers City-based station WRGZ at 96.7 FM.

WATZ history
WATZ signed-on the air in the late 1960s, as an adult contemporary station at 93.5 FM, known for several years as "Z93." In 1988, the format of WATZ-FM was changed to country and the frequency-signal moved to 99.3 so that the station could boost its power from 3,000 to 50,000 watts. For the next several years, WATZ-FM simulcasted the long-time country music format of sister station WATZ AM. In the mid-90s, WATZ AM had switched to a news/talk format while WATZ-FM retained the country format. WATZ-FM became a 24-hour broadcaster in 1999, using a satellite feed from Jones Radio Networks from 11 p.m. to 5:30 a.m. Prior to this, the station went off the air at 1 a.m.

WATZ today
WATZ-FM remains locally owned and operated by the same company that founded the AM station in 1946. All of its programming from 5:30 a.m. to 11 p.m. on weekdays, and during the day on weekends (except for syndicated shows such as Bob Kingsley's Country Top 40) is broadcast from the station’s studios in downtown Alpena.

References
Michiguide.com - WATZ-FM History

External links

ATZ-FM
Country radio stations in the United States